Hurricane is a 1974 American TV film. It was an ABC Movie of the Week.

Cast
Larry Hagman as Paul Damon
Martin Milner as Major Stoddard
Jessica Walter as Louise Damon
Barry Sullivan as Hank Stoddard
Michael Learned as Lee Jackson
Frank Sutton as Bert Pearson
Will Geer as Dr McCutcheon
Lonny Chapman as Pappy

Reception
The Los Angeles Times called it "a mediocre disaster movie".

References

External links

Hurricane at TCMDB

1974 television films
1974 films
1970s disaster films
Films about tropical cyclones
Films about hurricanes
American disaster films
Disaster television films
Films directed by Jerry Jameson
Films scored by Vic Mizzy
ABC Movie of the Week
1970s American films